The Rhein Fire was a professional football team in the NFL Europe, formerly the World League of American Football. Established in Germany in 1995, the franchise resurrected the name of the former Birmingham Fire team which was active during the 1991–1992 WLAF seasons.

History
The team was based in Düsseldorf (and early on was occasionally referred to in the U.S. as the Düsseldorf Fire), playing its games in LTU arena since 2005 season. Prior to this the team played in Rheinstadion until 2002 and in FC Schalke 04's Arena AufSchalke from 2003 to 2004 in nearby city Gelsenkirchen while LTU arena was being built. The team shared facilities with the football (soccer) club Fortuna Düsseldorf. The Fire hosted the World Bowl a record five times: in 1999 and 2002 in the Rheinstadion, in 2004 in Gelsenkirchen, and in 2005 and 2006 in the LTU arena.

The Fire was one of NFL Europa's most successful teams as far as fan appeal and competitively on the field. The team itself played for five World Bowl championships throughout its history, winning in 1998 (over the Frankfurt Galaxy) and 2000 (over the Scottish Claymores).

Season-by-season

Coaching history

Head coaches

Assistant coaches

 Antonio Anderson (2006)
 Bart Andrus (2000)
 Mike Bender (2001)
 Booker Brooks (2001)
 Steve Carson (1996–1997)
 Wes Chandler (1995–1997)
 Joe Clark (2001)
 Ken Clarke (2004–2005)
 Stan Davis (2007)
 A. J. Duhe (1995)
 Don Eck (2007)
 Tom Everest (2002)
 Barry Foster (2003)
 Sascha Gehloff (2005–2007)
 Brian Webb (2006)
 Alvin Harper (2005)
 James Harrell (2004)
 Bernardo Harris (2007)
 Mike Jones (1998–2000, 2002–2003)
 Whitey Jordan (1998–2000, 2002–2004)
 E. J. Junior (2005)
 Ken Karcher (1997–1999)
 Pete Kuharchek (1996–2000)
 Bob Lancaster (2006)
 Pete Levine (1996)
 Steve Logan (2006)
 Bob Lord (1997)
 Duval Love (2006)
 Jörn Maier (2001–2004)
 Vince Marrow (2007)
 Guy McIntyre (2002)
 Scott Milanovich (2003–2005)
 Larry New (2007)
 Jeff Ogden (2004)
 Kevin O'Neal (2004–2005)
 Ed O'Neil (2001–2003)
 Nate Poole (2007)
 Jan Quarless (2005)
 Jeff Reinebold (1995, 1999–2000)
 Walter Rohlfing (1995–2000)
 Steve Smith (2006)
 Don Strock (1995)
 Gary Tranquill (2007)
 Dean Unruh (1995–1996)
 Adrian White (2001–2006)

Notable players
  Richard Adjei (2004–2007)
    Ingo Anderbrügge (2003–2004), former Schalke 04 soccer player, kicker during Fire's years in Gelsenkirchen
    Cedric Bonner (2006–2007)
    Manfred Burgsmüller (1996–2002), kicker and oldest professional American football player at age 52
    Byron Chamberlain (1996)
    Derrick Clark (1996–1999)
    Mike Croel (1998)
    Terry Crews (1995)
    Nick Ferguson (1998)
    Patrick Gerigk  (1998)
     James Harrison (2004)
    Drew Henson (2006)
    Andy Kelly (1996)
    Fred Jackson (2006)
    Michael Lewis (2001)
    Mike Quinn (1998)
    Marcus Robinson (1998)
    Jamal Robertson (2002)
    Bill Schroeder (1997)
    Gino Torretta (1995)
    Tony Wragge (2006)
    Danny Wuerffel (2000)
 Tamon Nakamura (1998-1999)
 Akihito Amaya (2001-2002)
 John David Washington (2007)

Other notable personnel

 Alexander Leibkind – General Manager 1996–2004
 Ken Karcher – Assistant coach for the Fire, was previously an NFL replacement player and later became a collegiate head coach.
 Oliver Luck – General Manager 1995, became league president the following year.

References

 
NFL Europe (WLAF) teams
Defunct American football teams in Germany
Sport in Düsseldorf
American football teams established in 1995
American football teams disestablished in 2007
1995 establishments in Germany
2007 disestablishments in Germany